The 1951 West Virginia Mountaineers football team was an American football team that represented West Virginia University in the Southern Conference (SoCon) during the 1951 college football season. In its second season under head coach Art Lewis, the team compiled a 5–5 record (2–3 against SoCon opponents), tied for 10th place in the conference, and outscored opponents by a total of 225 to 190. The team played its home games at Mountaineer Field in Morgantown, West Virginia. James Danter and Kereazis Konstantinos were the team captains.

Schedule

References

West Virginia Mountaineers football seasons
West Virginia
West Virginia Mountaineers football